Badcaul is a village in Highland, Scotland, on the southern shore of Little Loch Broom and is a village in the Highland council area of Scotland.

References

Populated places in Ross and Cromarty